Statistics of the 1988–89 Saudi First Division.

External links 
 Saudi Arabia Football Federation
 Saudi League Statistics
 Al Jazirah 25 Jan 1989 issue 5963 

Saudi First Division League seasons
Saudi Professional League
2